Ivan Todorović (born January 17, 1984) is a Montenegrin-Syrian former professional basketball player. He played at the center position.

Professional career
During his pro career, Todorović played with numerous club, one of which was Sutjeska.

References

External links
 EuroCup Profile
 Player profile at ismbasket
 Player profile at realgm.com
 Player profile at eurobasket.com

1984 births
Living people
Aigaleo B.C. players
BC Kalev/Cramo players
CB L'Hospitalet players
Centers (basketball)
CS Universitatea Cluj-Napoca (men's basketball) players
Expatriate basketball people in Estonia
KK FMP (1991–2011) players
KK Lovćen players
KK Sutjeska players
Montenegrin expatriate basketball people in Greece
Montenegrin expatriate basketball people in Romania
Montenegrin expatriate basketball people in Serbia
Montenegrin expatriate basketball people in Spain
Montenegrin men's basketball players
Syrian men's basketball players